Claudio Luiz "Claudinho" Jandre Sobrinho (born September 25, 1981) is a Brazilian footballer who currently plays as a midfielder for Persijap Jepara in Indonesia Super League.

References

External links
 Profile at liga-indonesia.co.id

1981 births
Living people
Brazilian footballers
Brazilian expatriate footballers
Association football midfielders
Brazilian expatriate sportspeople in Indonesia
Expatriate footballers in Indonesia
Liga 1 (Indonesia) players
Persijap Jepara players